Tonmalaw is a river village in Homalin Township, Hkamti District, in the Sagaing Region of northwestern Burma. It is located south of Hmawyonmyaing.

References

External links
Maplandia World Gazetteer

Populated places in Hkamti District
Homalin Township